Gabrielle Laïla Tittley (born February 22, 1988) is a self-taught Canadian multidisciplinary artist who goes by the name Pony, which stands for "Poor One Newly Young".

Life 
Gabrielle Laïla Tittley was born to a Palestinian mother and a Franco-Ontarian father on February 22, 1988, in Quebec City, Quebec. She grew up in Outaouais and Newfoundland before moving to Montreal at the age of 17.

Career

Events and installations

L'Amour Passe à Travers le Linge 
Tittley created L'Amour Passe à Travers le Linge (LAPATLL), a charity event that took place yearly from 2013 to 2015. In partnership with other visual artists, the objective was to raise money for different non-profit organizations by selling limited-edition shirts.

No Role Models 
Tittley's 2017 immersive installation, No Role Models, was initially inspired by rapper J. Cole. Joe Rocca, a member of local group Dead Obies, was in charge of the music for this 3-dimension exhibition at the PHI Centre in Montreal's Old Port. The event took place from March 4 to March 9, 2017, during that year's edition of the Nuit Blanche festival.

Fun House 
In 2018, Tittley collaborated with Aldo during the yearly edition of Mural Festival. The artist participated in the Fun House project, which consisted of a two-level art installation on Saint-Laurent Boulevard. Pony's partnership with the shoe retailer also entailed the creation of a special edition of Pony x Aldo Mx3 sneakers, released on August 23, 2018.

Pop-ups and stores 
Tittley has a company named Pony which sells clothing, pins, stickers, and prints. In January 2019, Tittley's art and merchandise were exposed for an event and pop-up shop at Zeppelin Station in Denver, Colorado. After multiple ephemeral pop-up shops, the artist's first permanent store, Emotions Infinies par Pony, opened in October 2020 on Plaza Saint-Hubert in Montreal.

Au Bout du Feel 
A few months later, Pony participated in a fashion show for the 2019 edition of the Festival Mode & Design. Her segment, titled Au Bout du Feel, was presented on August 21.

Series

Still Optimiste 
With Sid Lee's assistance, Pony created the digital illustrations Still Optimiste, published on Behance on July 13, 2016. The series was produced with a combination of photography and digital imaging techniques.

Hoaka swimwear 
In 2018, Tittley collaborated with Quebecois business woman Elisabeth Rioux, owner and founder of Hoaka Swimwear. Together, they launched a collection of swimsuits influenced by Pony's illustrations.

Mental Wealth 
Tel-Jeunes and Pony worked together on a mental health campaign in October 2019. This project aimed to address issues that teenagers may experience such as hyper-sexualization and technology addiction. Comedic short films were shared on social media to raise awareness on mental health issues. Pony also created a line of clothes and illustrations around the same theme.

Television 
The first season of Résiste! originally aired on February 9, 2021, on TV5. This cultural magazine, composed of ten episodes, is Tittley's first experience as a television host. For this show, she travels to different cities in North America and Europe and attempts to grasp their cultural and socio-political context through art by meeting locals.

References 

1988 births
Living people
Artists from Quebec City
Canadian multimedia artists
Canadian people of Palestinian descent
French Quebecers
21st-century Canadian women artists